This list is for St. John the Baptist Cathedrals.  For St. John's Cathedrals, see St. John's Cathedral (disambiguation)

St. John the Baptist Cathedral, or variants thereof may refer to:

Argentina
 Anglican Cathedral of St. John the Baptist, Buenos Aires

Canada
 Basilica of St. John the Baptist, St. John's, Newfoundland (Roman Catholic)
 Cathedral of St. John the Baptist (St. John's), Newfoundland (Anglican)

France
 Aire Cathedral (Cathédrale Saint-Jean-Baptiste d'Aire)
 Alès Cathedral (Cathédrale Saint-Jean-Baptiste d'Alès)
 Bazas Cathedral (Cathédrale Saint-Jean-Baptiste de Bazas)
 Belley Cathedral (Cathédrale Saint-Jean-Baptiste de Belley)
 Calvi Cathedral (Pro-cathédrale Saint-Jean-Baptiste de Calvi)
 Lyon Cathedral (Cathédrale Saint-Jean-Baptiste de Lyon)
 Perpignan Cathedral (Cathédrale Saint-Jean-Baptiste de Perpignan)

Germany
 Basilica of St. John the Baptist, Berlin

Ireland
 St John's Cathedral (Limerick) (Roman Catholic)
 St John the Baptist Cathedral, Sligo (Church of Ireland)

Italy
 Cathedral of Saint John the Baptist (Turin)

Malta
 Saint John's Co-Cathedral, Valletta

Poland
Cathedral of St. John the Baptist, Przemyśl (Greek Catholic)
St. John's Archcathedral, Warsaw (Roman Catholic)
Wrocław Cathedral, also called Cathedral of St. John the Baptist (Roman Catholic)

Slovakia
 Temple of St. John the Baptist (Prešov), also called Greek Catholic St. John the Baptist Cathedral (Byzantine Catholic)
 St. John the Baptist Cathedral (Trnava) (Roman Catholic)

Ukraine
 Synaxis of John the Baptist church, Yakymiv

United Kingdom
 St John the Baptist Cathedral, Norwich (Roman Catholic)
 St John the Baptist's Church, Chester, also called the Cathedral Church of Saint John the Baptist (Anglican)

United States

 Cathedral of St. John in the Wilderness, Denver, Colorado (Episcopal)
 Cathedral of St. John the Baptist (Washington, D.C.) (Russian Orthodox)
 Cathedral of St. John the Baptist (Savannah, Georgia) (Roman Catholic)
 St. John's Parish (Quincy, Illinois), cathedral of the Diocese of Quincy (Anglican)
 Cathedral of St. John the Baptist (Parma, Ohio) (Byzantine Catholic)
 Cathedral of St. John the Baptist (Paterson, New Jersey)
 St. John the Baptist Byzantine Catholic Cathedral (Pittsburgh), Pennsylvania
 Cathedral of Saint John the Baptist (Charleston, South Carolina) (Roman Catholic)

See also
 St. John the Baptist Church (disambiguation)
 St. John's Cathedral (disambiguation)–mainly dedicated to St. John the Evangelist
 San Juan Cathedral (disambiguation)